The Camera Austria Award for Contemporary Photography by the City of Graz (Camera Austria-Preis für zeitgenössische Fotografie der Stadt Graz) is an award given every two years since 1989 by the city of Graz.

Notes

External links
Camera Austria Award

Awards established in 1989
Austrian awards
Graz
Photography awards
Municipal awards
Photography in Austria